Hangman Island, also known as Hayman's Island, is an island in the Quincy Bay area of the Boston Harbor Islands National Recreation Area. The island is a barren outcrop of bedrock, with a permanent size of half an acre rising to only three feet above sea level, plus an intertidal zone of a further . Access is by private boat only.

On a 1775, London chart, this island was labeled Hayman's Island and shows a greater area than presently exists. There is no historical evidence that this island was used as a location for hanging criminals. The source of its current name has a hazy history. In 1882, several fishermen built fishing shacks on Hangman Island and were reported to have cultivated a vegetable garden here among the rocks.

References

Boston Harbor islands
Coastal islands of Massachusetts
Islands of Norfolk County, Massachusetts